José León Bernal (born 3 February 1995) is a Spanish professional footballer who plays for CD Tenerife. Mainly a central defender, he can also play as a defensive midfielder.

Football career

Real Madrid
In 2004, aged seven, León joined Real Madrid's youth academy from local CD Aviación. He made his senior debut in the 2013–14 season, playing 17 games for the C-team in the Segunda División B.

On 25 May 2014, León made his professional debut, coming on as a second-half substitute in a 0–2 loss at Córdoba CF in the Segunda División.  On 31 August 2016, he was loaned to Cultural y Deportiva Leonesa for one year.

Rayo Vallecano
On 25 August 2018, León signed a two-year contract with La Liga side Rayo Vallecano. However, aged 23 and registered in the B-team, he could not play for either side.

In February 2019, León joined Swedish side AFC Eskilstuna on loan until June. On 29 August, after making no appearances for Rayo, he terminated his contract with Rayo.

Fuenlabrada
On 30 August 2019, free agent León agreed to a one-year deal with CF Fuenlabrada, also in the second division. He made his debut for the club on 1 October, starting in a 0–1 loss at CD Numancia, and contributed with 21 matches overall during the season.

Alcorcón
On 20 September 2020, León signed for AD Alcorcón, still in division two. He became a regular starter for the club, and scored his first professional goal on 20 December by netting his team's second in a 2–1 home win over FC Cartagena.

Tenerife
On 20 June 2021, León agreed to a two-year contract with fellow second level side CD Tenerife.

Honours
Cultural Leonesa
Segunda División B: 2016–17

References

External links
Real Madrid official profile
 
 

1995 births
Living people
Footballers from Madrid
Spanish footballers
Association football defenders
Association football midfielders
Segunda División players
Segunda División B players
Real Madrid C footballers
Real Madrid Castilla footballers
Cultural Leonesa footballers
Rayo Vallecano players
CF Fuenlabrada footballers
AD Alcorcón footballers
CD Tenerife players
Allsvenskan players
AFC Eskilstuna players
Spain youth international footballers
Spanish expatriate footballers
Spanish expatriate sportspeople in Sweden
Expatriate footballers in Sweden